The 1949 Argentine Primera División was the 58th season of top-flight football in Argentina. The season began on April 24 and ended on February 16, 1950.

Atlanta and Ferro Carril Oeste returned to Primera, while Lanús was relegated. Racing won its 10th league title.

For the first time, the AFA established as mandatory the use of squad numbers for Primera División matches. Displayed on players' backs, shirts had to be numbered from 2 to 11 so this rule was not mandatory for goalkeepers. The system entered into force since the 9th fixture on June 26.

League standings

References

Argentine Primera División seasons
Argentine Primera Division
Primera Division